Dancin' On the Back Streets is the third album by the late-1980s hard rock band Blue Tears. Long after the band members got involved in other projects, some of their unreleased material started to surface on the Internet. Band leader Gregg Fulkerson decided to compile an album of most of this material and release it officially. This was the second compilation album, released the same year as Mad, Bad and Dangerous. It was released December 5, 2005.

Track listing
 "Summer Girl"
 "Loud Guitars, Fast Cars & Wild, Wild Women"
 "Kiss And Tell"
 "Storm In My Heart"
 "Slip And Fall"
 "A Date With Destiny"
 "All Cried Out"
 "Forever Yours"
 "Do You Want Me?"
 "Small Town Dreams"
 "Livin' In The Movies"
 "She's Not Falling In Love"
 "Strong"
 "Touch"
 "Dark of The Night"
 "Dream of Me"

Band
 Gregg Fulkerson – lead vocals, guitars and keyboards
 Bryan Hall – guitar and vocals
 Michael Spears – bass and vocals
 Charlie Lauderdale – drums and percussion

References 

http://www.sleazeroxx.com/bands/bluetears/dancin.shtml

Blue Tears albums
2005 albums